Lidiya is a feminine given name.

People
Lidiya Alfeyeva (born 1946), a Soviet long jumper
Lidiya Belozyorova (1945–2022), Ukrainian actresses
Lidiya Ginzburg (1902–1990), a major Soviet literary critic and a survivor of the siege of Leningrad
Lidiya Grigoryeva (born 1974), a Russian long-distance runner from the Chuvashia region
Lidiya Krylova (born 1951), a Russian rower who competed for the Soviet Union in the 1976 Summer Olympics
Lidiya Masterkova (1927–2008), a Russian-born French painter, non-conformist artist in USSR
Lidiya Khudat Rasulova, (1941–2012), Azerbaijani politician
Lidiya Skoblikova (born 1939), the most successful Olympic speed skater in terms of Olympic gold medals
Lidiya Sukharevskaya (1909–1991), a Soviet stage actress and playwright renowned for her work with Nikolay Akimov and Andrey Goncharov
Lidiya Shulaykina (1915–1995), Russian attack pilot during the Second World War
Lidiya Vertinskaya (1923–2013), Soviet/Russian actress and artist
Lidiya Zontova (born 1936), retired Russian rower

Other
3322 Lidiya (1975 XY1), a main-belt asteroid discovered in 1975

See also
 Lidia
Lidija
 Lydia